The Cincinnati Bearcats football team represents the University of Cincinnati in the East Division of the American Athletic Conference (AAC), competing as part of the National Collegiate Athletic Association (NCAA) Division I Football Bowl Subdivision (FBS). The program has had 39 head coaches and three interim coaches during its existence, as well as one stint with no coach and two periods with the program on hiatus. The Bearcats have been participating in college football since the 1885 season and were one of the first schools currently in the FBS to sponsor a football program.  Scott Satterfield is the current head coach; he replaced Tommy Tuberville following the latter's resignation at the end of the 2016 season.

The program's current nickname, "Bearcats", was first used in 1914 and was formally adopted in 1919. Prior to then, common terms like "Varsity" or "Red and Black" (the team's colors) had been used to refer to the football team. The Bearcats have played in more than 1200 games during the program's 129 seasons (through the 2017 regular season). In that time, nine coaches have led the Bearcats in a post-season bowl game, eight have won a conference championship, and four have been inducted into the College Football Hall of Fame.

Rick Minter currently holds several records among Cincinnati coaches, including most games coached (117), seasons coached (10), games won (53), games lost (63), conference wins (23), and conference losses (30). Minter also holds, along with Tuberville and Brian Kelly, the record for most bowl games coached (3). Sid Gillman guided the Bearcats to three Mid-American Conference (MAC) championships, the most of any Cincinnati coach in any conference. Gillman also has the best conference win percentage of any coach (.929); Tom Fennell's .864 is the best regular season percentage, while Kelly's .850 leads among multi-season coaches. Only one interim coach, Steve Stripling, has won a game in that position.

Key

Coaches

Notes

References
General

 
 

Specific

Lists of college football head coaches

Ohio sports-related lists
Bearcats head football coaches